{{automatic taxobox
| image = 
| image_caption=
| taxon = Peptoclostridium
| authority = Galperin et al. 2016
| type_species = Peptacetobacter hominis 
| subdivision_ranks = Species
| subdivision = Peptoclostridium acidaminophilum Peptoclostridium litorale| synonyms =  
}}Peptoclostridium is a genus in family of Peptostreptococcaceae. 

Before assigned to the genus as currently defined, the name was previously proposed in 2013 as a novel genus hosting C. difficile as Peptoclostridium difficile, before that species was validly moved to the related genus Clostridioides'' in 2016.

References

Bacteria genera
Taxa described in 2016
Peptostreptococcaceae